The White River Railroad was an intrastate railroad in southeastern Vermont. It ran from Bethel, Vermont to Rochester, Vermont, a distance of approximately 19 miles.

History 
Planning for the White River Valley Electric Railroad began in 1896, and the line was charted along the course of the White River.  The name was changed to White River Valley Railroad and finally White River Railroad before construction began in 1899.  Built on a shoestring budget, the first train arrived in Rochester in December 1900.  Because the railroad followed the course of the White River closely, it was frequently damaged by floods and was often referred to as "The Peavine".  Like most railroads in Vermont, it was heavily damaged by the great Flood of November, 1927.  Though the railroad was fully rebuilt the following year, the Great Depression reduced traffic to fatal levels, and the railroad was abandoned in 1933.

Stations 
The railroad stopped at the following locations from east to west:

 Bethel, Vermont (interchange with the Central Vermont Railway and the Bethel Granite Railway)
 Lillieville, Vermont (informal flagstop)
 Gaysville, Vermont (station)
 Riverside (informal flagstop)
 Stockbridge, Vermont (station)
 Tupper's, Vermont (informal flagstop)
 Emerson, Vermont (informal flagstop)
 Talcville, Vermont (informal flagstop)
 Rochester, Vermont (station)

Locomotives

References 
Jones, Robert C., Railroads of Vermont, Volume II, 1993.

Herwig, Wes, A Whistle Up the Valley : The Story of the Peavine, Vermont's White River Railroad, 2005.

Defunct Vermont railroads